Vistoso Bosses were an American alternative hip-hop duo made up of Taylah P. and Kelci from Atlanta, Georgia. They debuted with the single "Delirious" produced by STJAMES, featuring Soulja Boy Tell 'Em, taken from their 2009 shelved album Confetti. They were also the first females signed to the Collipark Label, founded by Mr. Collipark aka Michael Crooms. They were featured on Space Cowboy's album: the song Party Like Animal. The duo split up in late 2010. Kelci was featured with another all-girl group called "We Are Gauge" from the Most Talented School In America on YouTube. Kelci is officially in an all-girl group called "We Are Levi".
Taylah P., now known as Taylor 7 Blayne, not long afterwards released her first solo single, Show Me The Money. She then appeared in the competition of 106&Park's, 106 the Search.

Discography

Mixtapes 
 The World Would Suck Without Girls (2010)

Singles

External links
 Official site
 Vistoso Bosses channel at Youtube
 Taylor 7 Blayne's official website

References

American rhythm and blues musical groups
American musical duos
Musical groups established in 2008
Musical groups disestablished in 2010